The men's individual poomsae event at the 2018 Asian Games took place on 19 August 2018 at Jakarta Convention Center Plenary Hall, Jakarta, Indonesia.

Kang Min-sung won South Korea's first gold medal at the 18th Asian Games in this event. Kang defeated Kourosh Bakhtiar of Iran in the men's individual poomsae final to claim a gold medal at the Asian Games in Indonesia. Chen Ching from Chinese Taipei and Pongporn Suvittayarak of Thailand finished third and won the bronze medal.

The poomsae competition was consisted of two patterns in each round. From Preliminary round to quarterfinals two Poomsae was selected randomly from Recognized Poomsae but from semifinals to the final one Poomsae was selected from Recognized Poomsae and one from New Poomsae.

Recognized Poomsae were Koryo, Keumgang, Taeback, Pyongwon and Shipjin. while New Poomsae were Bigak 2, Bigak 3 (Nareusya), Himchari, Saebyeol.

Schedule
All times are Western Indonesia Time (UTC+07:00)

Results

References

External links

Official website

Taekwondo at the 2018 Asian Games